Mouriño is a Spanish surname. Notable people with this surname include:
Adrián Mouriño (born 1988), Spanish footballer
Carlos Mouriño (born 1943), Spanish-Mexican businessman and president of RC Celta de Vigo
Carlos Casares Mouriño (1941-2002), Galician-language writer
Eliseo Mouriño (1927-1961), Argentine footballer
Gastón Mouriño (born 1994), Argentine handball player
Juan Camilo Mouriño (1971-2008), Mexican politician and son of Carlos Mouriño

See also
Morino (surname), Italian and Japanese equivalent
Mourinho (name), Portuguese equivalent

References

Spanish-language surnames